Educated Evans is a 1936 British comedy film, directed by William Beaudine and starring Max Miller.  The film, set in the world of horse racing, was based on the 1924 novel of the same name by the prolific Edgar Wallace.  It is one of five films starring Miller which is not known to be extant, and is classed as "missing, believed lost".  A sequel Thank Evans was released in 1938; it too is missing. The story was later adapted into a BBC television series Educated Evans in 1957.

The film was made at Teddington Studios, with sets designed by Peter Proud.

Plot
Cockney racing tipster Evans (Miller) is asked by a nouveau riche and socially aspirant couple to train a racehorse they have bought.  The couple know nothing about horse racing, but believe that ownership of a successful racehorse will be their entrée into the high society racing set.  Evans does not own a stable, so the horse has to live with him and his two lodgers in an urban mews.  He has to keep constantly on his toes, as circumstances continually threaten to reveal to the horse's owners the ramshackle conditions in which the animal is kept.

Despite its less than ideal training environment, the horse turns out to have a natural talent and great racing potential.  It does well in its outings, and is entered for a prestigious race.  Shortly before the big day, disaster strikes when the horse is stolen.  Evans has to track down and outwit the crooks, and manages to recover the horse in the nick of time.  Feeling confident of the horse's chances, Evans places a substantial bet on it to win the race.  In his excitement however, he makes a mistake and accidentally lays the bet on a no-hope nag at ridiculously long odds.  The race turns out to be a sensation, with all the favourites including Evans' horse failing to finish for one reason or another.  The hopeless carthorse Evans backed in error crosses the line first and he makes a huge financial profit.

Cast
 Max Miller as Educated Evans
 Clarice Mayne as Emily Hackett
 Hal Walters as Nobby
 Albert Whelan as Sgt. Challoner
 Nancy O'Neil as Mary
 George Merritt as Joe Markham
 Frederick Burtwell as Hubert
 Julien Mitchell as Arthur Hackett
 Percy Walsh as Captain Reed
 Prince Monolulu as Himself

Reception
Educated Evans received a positive reception from contemporary reviewers.  This was Miller's seventh film, and it had previously been a commonly held opinion that the line in fast-talking patter which had made Miller a stage star did not necessarily translate effectively to the screen, particularly as Miller reportedly refuted any suggestion that he should try to slow down or moderate his delivery to better suit the cinema vernacular; however critics seemed to agree that on this occasion it worked very well.  Kine Weekly termed the film "an excellent popular booking... already past the box-office post". McCarthy's Report agreed that "though a one man show, there is plenty of popular entertainment to be found in the dialogue, the animated racecourse scenes and many tricks of the trade".  As one of the most favourably received of Miller's films in its day, Educated Evans is included on the British Film Institute's "75 Most Wanted" list of missing British feature films.

References

External links
 BFI 75 Most Wanted entry, with extensive notes
 
 Educated Evans at BFI Film & TV Database

1936 films
1936 comedy films
British comedy films
British black-and-white films
1930s English-language films
Films based on works by Edgar Wallace
Films directed by William Beaudine
Films set in England
British horse racing films
Lost British films
Films shot at Teddington Studios
Warner Bros. films
1930s British films